Íñigo Cervantes and Juan Lizariturry were the defending champions, but they did not participate this year.

Italians Paolo Lorenzi and Matteo Viola won the tournament, defeating Lee Hsin-han and Alessandro Motti in the final.

Seeds

Draw

External links
 Main Draw

International Tennis Tournament of Cortina - Doubles
2015 Doubles